Zirconium nitride is an inorganic compound used in a variety of ways due to its properties.

Properties
ZrN grown by physical vapor deposition (PVD) is a light gold color similar to elemental gold. ZrN has a room-temperature electrical resistivity of 12.0 µΩ·cm, a temperature coefficient of resistivity of 5.6·10−8 Ω·cm/K, a superconducting transition temperature of 10.4 K, and a relaxed lattice parameter of 0.4575 nm. The hardness of single-crystal ZrN is 22.7±1.7 GPa and elastic modulus is 450 GPa.

Uses

Zirconium nitride is a hard ceramic material similar to titanium nitride and is a cement-like refractory material. Thus it is used in refractories, cermets and laboratory crucibles. When applied using the physical vapor deposition coating process it is commonly used for coating medical devices, industrial parts (notably drill bits), automotive and aerospace components and other parts subject to high wear and corrosive environments. 

Zirconium nitride was suggested as a hydrogen peroxide fuel tank liner for rockets and aircraft.

References

Nitrides
Zirconium(III) compounds
Superhard materials
Refractory materials
Rock salt crystal structure